The 1990 Cheltenham Gold Cup was a horse race which took place at Cheltenham on Thursday March 15, 1990. It was the 63rd running of the Cheltenham Gold Cup, and it was won by Norton's Coin. The winner was ridden by Graham McCourt and trained by Sirrel Griffiths. The pre-race favourite Desert Orchid finished third.

With a starting price of 100/1, Norton's Coin became the longest-odds winner in the race's history; he had only been entered due a mistake over the deadline for another race. He was the second winner to be trained in Wales – the first was Patron Saint in 1928.

Race details
 Sponsor: Tote
 Winner's prize money: £67,003.40
 Going: Good to Firm
 Number of runners: 12
 Winner's time: 6m 30.9s (new record)

Full result

* The distances between the horses are shown in lengths or shorter. PU = pulled-up.† Trainers are based in Great Britain unless indicated.

Winner's details
Further details of the winner, Norton's Coin:

 Foaled: 1981 in Great Britain
 Sire: Mount Cassino; Dam: Grove Chance (St Columbus)
 Owner: Sirrel Griffiths
 Breeder: G. P. Thomas

References

 
 news.google.co.uk/newspapers – New Straits Times – March 17, 1990.

Cheltenham Gold Cup
 1990
Cheltenham Gold Cup
Cheltenham Gold Cup
1990s in Gloucestershire